Adventure Express is a mine train roller coaster located at Kings Island amusement park in Mason, Ohio. Designed and built by Arrow Dynamics, the ride opened to the public on April 13, 1991. It is located in the Adventure Port section of the park near Enrique's. Like many traditional mine trains, the Adventure Express features a lap bar restraint and does not contain any inversions.

History
Kings Island approached Arrow Dynamics and one of its lead designers, Ron Toomer, in 1990 to build a traditional mine train roller coaster with a unique twist. Unlike previous Arrow installations, this one would be heavily-themed and produce an "out-of-control feeling" inspired by scenes from the 1984 film Indiana Jones and the Temple of Doom. Construction began later that year, and the total cost to build the family ride was estimated at $4 million. The ride was marketed as a jungle adventure mine train that plunges "through steamy volcanic tunnels, across rickety bridges, and into a deserted mine shaft inhabited by snakes and spiders".  The roller coaster opened on April 13, 1991. During the 2021-2022 offseason, the ride got repainted for the park's 50th anniversary celebration. In October 2022, Kings Island announced that the ride would receive enhanced theming as part of the retheming of the Oktoberfest area to Adventure Port in 2023.

Ride description

As the train leaves the station, it makes a small turn right followed by a small turn left. The train then dips into a slightly-banked turn to the right through a jungle-themed tunnel labeled with a large sign reading "Track Closed". After exiting, the train moves over a brake run that slows the train on its way through a second tunnel, where the train makes a sharp, 90-degree turn to the left into the roller coaster's first lift hill. It exits the tunnel at the beginning of the ascent, where a skeleton wearing a safari outfit is seen perched to the right with a spear through the chest and a snake wrapped around its neck. Riders pass under several wooden beams, each featuring a tiki-themed face mounted at the center.

After reaching the top, the train makes a short dip before descending quickly down a winding 270-degree turn to the right. The turn ends with a short dip followed by an ascending 90-degree turn to the left. At the crest of the turn, the train descends again through a slightly-banked turn to the right. After leveling out, riders experience another slightly-banked turn to the left into the coaster's third tunnel. As the train exits, the turn switches to the right and is followed by two ascending left turns that lead into the final tunnel. A second brake run slows the train inside as it enters the second lift hill which is completely enclosed. Large stone warrior statues in several rows with glowing eyes can be seen lining both sides during the ascent. Their arms move in sync rhythmically with clenched fists that are seemingly pounding down towards riders. At the top of the hill is a centrally-mounted stone warrior with sharply-lit eyes appearing to pour a vat of lava – a stationary lit object – on riders as they pass underneath. The train takes a short dip, exits the tunnel in a turn to the right and enters the final brake run before returning to the station.

Theme
Adventure Express is themed to a treasure hunting adventure reminiscent of the film Raiders of the Lost Ark from the Indiana Jones franchise. During the years the park was owned by Paramount Parks, the film's theme music could be heard in the line queue with the voice of a station master welcoming "archaeologists and explorers". Throughout the course of the ride, a variety of sounds imitating the setting of a rainforest are projected around riders as they pass through different areas on the ride. In the final tunnel during the train's ascent, an ominous voice speaks over a haunting musical track stating, "You have disturbed the forbidden temple. Now you will pay!"

Some special effects have since been removed. The Indiana Jones theme music with commentary no longer plays in the line queue and the voice along with some lighting effects in the final tunnel are no longer present .

Dedication

The construction of the Adventure Express is dedicated to Robert G. Rinckel, who served as construction manager at Kings Island from 1974 to 1990. He died prior to its opening, and a dedication plaque dated April 12, 1991, was placed on a stone near the entrance to the ride.

References

External links
Kings Island Central information - Alternate source of details and stats.
Kings Island official site - Adventure Express
https://en.wikipedia.org/w/index.php?title=Adventure_Express&action=edit&section=1

Roller coasters operated by Cedar Fair
Roller coasters in Ohio
Roller coasters introduced in 1991
Hybrid roller coasters